The 1989 NSL Cup was the thirteenth season of the NSL Cup, which was the main national association football knockout cup competition in Australia. 12 teams from around Australia entered the competition.

Round of 16

Quarter-finals

Semi-finals

Final

References

NSL Cup
Cup
NSL Cup seasons